was a Rinzai Zen Buddhist roshi. He was the founding abbot of the New York Zendo Shobo-Ji in Manhattan and Dai Bosatsu Zendo Kongo-Ji monastery in the Catskill mountains of New York; he was forced to resign from that position of 40 years after revelations of a series of sexual relationships with and alleged sexual harassment of female students. This case was never brought to court and Shimano never admitted any wrong doing.

Biography
Eido Shimano was born in Tokyo, Japan, in 1932. His first encounter with a Buddhist scripture came at the age of nine, when his school teacher instructed his class to memorize the Heart Sutra. During the war the Shimano family moved to Chichibu, the mountain city where his mother was born. He died February 18, 2018, at Shogen-ji, Gifu, Japan, after having given a teisho (lecture) on Dogen's "Life and Death". Until his death, he held regular meetings with his sangha in both the US and Europe.

In his youth Shimano was ordained as a novice monk by Kengan Goto, the priest of Empuku-ji, the Rinzai temple in Chichibu. Kengan Goto gave him the Dharma name Eido, composed from first characters of two Japanese Zen founders, Eisai and Dogen. Later he was trained by Shirozou Keizan Roshi, abbot of Heirin-ji, near Tokyo. This was a Rinzai training monastery with strict discipline.

In 1954, Shimano left to study at Ryutaku-ji and practice with Soen Nakagawa Roshi, a relatively young Zen teacher. The following year Nyogen Senzaki visited the temple from America and left a lasting impression on Shimano. In 1957, Soen Roshi asked Shimano to go to America for one year to attend the elderly Nyogen Senzaki. He agreed, but Nyogen died in 1958 before Shimano had a chance to go.

Soen asked Shimano to go to Hawaii instead to help to guide the Diamond Sangha, founded by Robert Baker Aitken and his wife, Anne Hopkins Aitken. At first reluctant, Soen persuaded Shimano that going to Hawaii would be good for both his recuperation from an illness and his academic studies (suggesting he study at the University of Hawaii).

On August, 1960 Shimano left for Hawaii by ship. His friend Bernard Phillips, an American Zen scholar, was returning home on the same ship, after doing research in Japan sponsored by the Zen Studies Society. Without any prior arrangements, they ended up in the same cabin.

Shimano later returned to Japan and met Haku'un Yasutani, accompanying him and Soen back to the United States. In 1964, after a rift developed with Aitken, he moved to New York City. In 1965, he became the teacher of the Zen Studies Society in a Manhattan Upper Westside apartment and a few years later became abbot of the Zen Studies Society, consisting of the New York Zendo Shobo-Ji in Manhattan and Dai Bosatsu Zendo Kongo-Ji monastery in the Catskills mountains.

Shimano received Dharma transmission from Soen Nakagawa in 1972 in a public ceremony at the New York Zendo Shobo-ji witnessed by his Sangha. In 2004, Eido Shimano Roshi received the Buddhism Transmission Award from the Japan-based Bukkyo Dendo Kyokai Foundation for his impact on the dissemination of Buddhism in the West. This same organization produced a documentary on Eido Shimano Roshi and Dai Bosatsu Zendo Kongo-Ji.

Controversy

In July 2010, Eido and his wife resigned from the ZSS Board of Directors after a  relationship between Shimano and one of his female students became a subject of controversy, amid allegations that this was only the latest in a series of affairs and accusations of sexual misconduct spanning at least four decades. Shimano sent a letter of apology to the ZSS community in September, 2010, stating that he would retire as abbot of the Zen Studies Society in December. He did so on December 8, 2010. Shinge Roko Sherry Chayat Roshi, who received dharma transmission in 1998, was installed as the new Abbot on January 1, 2011.

In February, 2011, the Zen Studies Society announced that Eido Shimano no longer would teach Zen under the auspices of their organization. On July 2, 2011, an open meeting for all sangha members of the ZSS was held, where Shimano encouraged everyone to accept his successor, Shinge Sherry Chayat, as their teacher, and stated unequivocally that in order to avoid further controversy and division, he would no longer formally teach Zen in any capacity.

A committee of Zen teachers formed in November 2011 found that the sexual acts were often initiated during formal private sanzen interactions between Zen teacher and student.

In December, 2012, Myoshinji, the headquarters of Shimano's claimed lineage sect, issued a public statement responding to the controversies surrounding Shimano and ZSS; they state they have 

Shimano and his wife filed a multimillion-dollar lawsuit against the Society in 2013, but dropped it in 2015. Eido Shimano died of pneumonia on February 18, 2018, in Japan at the age of 85.

Dharma heirs
 Junpo Denis Kelly
 Andy Afable
 Sherry Chayat
 John Mortensen (now Egmund T. Sommer)
 Genjo Marinello

Bibliography

Shimano, Eido ed. (1978). Like a Dream, Like a Fantasy: The Zen Teachings and Translations of Nyogen Senzaki.. Japan Publications.

See also
 Zen in the USA
 Buddhism in the United States
 List of Rinzai Buddhists
 Timeline of Zen Buddhism in the United States

Notes

References

Book references

News references

Web references

Sources

External links
 Sweeping Zen, Eido Shimano Collection
 Vladimir K. and Stuart Lachs, The Aitken-Shimano Letters
 The Shimano Archive
 Christopher Hamacher, "Zen Has No Morals!" - The Latent Potential for Corruption and Abuse in Zen Buddhism, as Exemplified by Two Recent Cases

1932 births
2018 deaths
Zen Buddhist abbots
Buddhism in the United States
Religious leaders from New York (state)
Buddhism in New York (state)
Japanese Buddhist clergy
Rinzai Buddhists
Japanese Zen Buddhists
American Zen Buddhists
American Buddhist monks
Rōshi
People from Tokyo